St. Paul–North Water Streets Historic District is a national historic district located at Rochester in Monroe County, New York. The district consists of a relatively intact cluster of 17 commercial, manufacturing, and warehouse structures.

It was listed on the National Register of Historic Places in 1984.

References

External links

Historic districts in Rochester, New York
Historic districts on the National Register of Historic Places in New York (state)
National Register of Historic Places in Rochester, New York